Vedanayagam Sastriar of Thanjavur, poet-lyricist, court poet in the palace of Serfoji II. He was a poet and writer with 133 books and over 500 lyrics to his credit.

This Vedanayagam must be distinguished from the other and later Mayavaram Vedanayagam Pillai.

External links
https://www.thehindu.com/news/cities/chennai/confusingvedanayagams/article21831136.ece 
Vedanayagamsastriar
www.sastriars.org Sastriars

Tamil poets
Indian Lutherans
People from Tirunelveli district
1774 births
1864 deaths
19th-century Indian poets
Poets from Tamil Nadu
Indian male poets
19th-century Indian male writers